Macabre is an American extreme metal band from Chicago. Since their formation in 1985, the band has featured the same three members with no lineup changes. The group's style blends thrash metal, death metal, and grindcore (sometimes with nursery rhymes and folk melodies). Lyrically Macabre have a strong focus on serial killers, mass murderers and humorous elements. The group is currently signed to Nuclear Blast.

Influences
Macabre's music was strongly influenced by US and UK hardcore, grindcore, and death metal acts, ranging from  Venom, The Accüsed, Suicidal Tendencies, and Cryptic Slaughter to Possessed and Napalm Death. Macabre's dark sense of humor alienated casual metal listeners, however it helped to gain a small but strong cult status.

Some of the serial killers mentioned in their songs are: 
 David Berkowitz (Son of Sam)
 Ted Bundy
 Vlad the Impaler
 Ed Gein (The Butcher of Plainfield)
 Charles Manson
 Jeffrey Dahmer (The Milwaukee Cannibal)
 John Wayne Gacy (The Killer Clown)
 Jack the Ripper
 Edmund Kemper (The Co-ed Killer)
Peter Kürten (The Vampire of Düsseldorf)
 Herman Mudgett (H.H. Holmes)
 Richard Ramirez (The Night Stalker)
 Gary Ridgway (The Green River Killer)
 Zodiac

Members
 Nefarious (Charles Lescewicz) – bass, vocals (1984–present)
 Dennis the Menace (Dennis Ritchie) – drums (1984–present)
 Corporate Death (Lance Lencioni) – guitar, vocals (1984–present)

Discography
 Shitlist (1987)
 Grim Reality (1987)
 "Shitlist" (1988, 7")
 Gloom (1989)
 "Nightstalker" (1991, 7")
 Sinister Slaughter (1993)
 Behind the Wall of Sleep (1994, EP) 
 Unabomber (1999, EP)
 Dahmer (2000)
 Capitalist Casualties / Macabre(2001, split with Capitalist Casualties)
 Morbid Campfire Songs (2002, as the Macabre Minstrels)
 Drill Bit Lobotomy (2002, 7")
 Murder Metal (2003)
 Macabre Electric & Acoustic Two CD Set (2004, 2-CD set including the CDs Murder Metal and Macabre Minstrels)
 True Tales of Slaughter and Slaying (2006, DVD)
 Grim Reality (2008) − re-issue featuring the remastered 1980s version and a Neil Kernon remix version
 Human Monsters (2010, EP)
 Grim Scary Tales (2011)
 Slaughter Thy Poser(2012, EP)
 Carnival of Killers (2020)

References

External links
 

Heavy metal musical groups from Illinois
American death metal musical groups
Deathgrind musical groups
American grindcore musical groups
American thrash metal musical groups
American musical trios
Musical groups from Chicago
Musical groups established in 1985
Season of Mist artists
1985 establishments in Illinois